George Brown Goode (February 13, 1851 – September 6, 1896), was an American ichthyologist and museum administrator. He graduated from Wesleyan University and studied at Harvard University.

Early life and family
George Brown Goode was born February 13, 1851, in New Albany, Indiana, to Francis Collier Goode and Sarah Woodruff Crane Goode. He spent his childhood in Cincinnati, Ohio and Amenia, New York. He married Sarah Ford Judd on November 29, 1877. She was the daughter of Orange Judd, a prominent agricultural writer. Together, they had four children: Margaret Judd, Kenneth Mackarness, Francis Collier, and Philip Burwell.

In addition to his scientific publications, Goode wrote Virginia Cousins: A Study of the Ancestry and Posterity of John Goode of Whitbywhere he traced his ancestry back to John Goode, a 17th-century colonist from Whitby.

Career
In 1872, Goode started working with Spencer Baird, soon becoming his trusted assistant. While working with Baird, Goode led research sponsored by the United States Fish Commission, and oversaw many Smithsonian displays and exhibitions, for the museum itself and for expositions around the world; Goode's first of these were the preparations for the Philadelphia Centennial Exposition, for which the Smithsonian was responsible for all the government displays. He also served as the assistant secretary of the Smithsonian Institution in charge of the United States National Museum.

Goode effectively ran both the fish research program of the U.S. Fish Commission and the Smithsonian Institution from 1873 to 1887. He was the United States Commissioner for Fish and Fisheries from 1887 to 1888. He authored many books and monographs and wrote more than 100 scientific reports and notes.

Goode was a member of the National Academy of Sciences and the American Academy of Arts and Sciences. He received from the Queen Regent of Spain the decoration of Commander in the Order of Isabella the Catholic. He also was awarded the degree of Ph.D. from Indiana University and that of LL.D. from Wesleyan University. In 1893, he served as president of the Philosophical Society of Washington. He died at Lanier Heights in Washington, D.C., on September 6, 1896, at the age of only 45, after a bout with pneumonia. He had been at work on a history of the Smithsonian's first fifty years, which were being celebrated in 1896. The then head of the Smithsonian, Samuel Pierpont Langley, completed the volume and wrote a memorial to Goode, published in 1901. He was buried at Oak Hill Cemetery in Washington, D.C.

Eponymy
The genus Goodea of splitfins was named in his honour by David Starr Jordan in 1880; this in turn gave his name to the family Goodeidae.

Species named after him include:
Bluefin killifish, Lucania goodei 
Southern eagle ray, Myliobatis goodei 
Goode croaker, Paralonchurus goodei 
Goode's desert horned lizard, Phrynosoma goodei 
Quillfish, Ptilichthys goodei 
Chilipepper, Sebastes goodei 
Palometa, Trachinotus goodei

Bibliography
Ichthyology and fisheries

The Fisheries and Fishery Industries of the United States, 7 volumes. (Washington, 1884–1887)
American Fishes; a Popular Treatise upon the Game and Food Fishes of North America, with Especial Reference to Habits and Methods of Capture (New York, 1888)

Museums
"Museum-History and Museums of History"
"The Museums of the Future"
"The Principles of Museum Administration"
 
(All are available in A Memorial of George Brown Goode)

See also
:Category:Taxa named by George Brown Goode
 "The New Museum Idea"

References

Further reading
Alexander, Edward M. (1983). Museum Masters: Their Museums and Their Influence (Nashville: American Association for State and Local History).
"The Origins of Natural Science in America:  Essays of George Brown Goode," ed. with intro. by Sally Gregory Kohlstedt (Washington: Smithsonian Institution Press, 1991).

External links

The George Brown Goode Papers at the University of Virginia
George Brown Goode Papers at the Smithsonian Institution Archives
Samuel P. Langley's A Memorial of G. Brown Goode 1901 on GoogleBooks
National Academy of Sciences Biographical Memoir

1851 births
1896 deaths
American ichthyologists
Burials at Oak Hill Cemetery (Washington, D.C.)
Harvard University alumni
Historians of science
Members of the United States National Academy of Sciences
National Geographic Society founders
People from Amenia, New York
People from New Albany, Indiana
Scientists from Cincinnati
Scientists from Washington, D.C.
Smithsonian Institution people
United States Fish Commission personnel
Wesleyan University alumni
Museum administrators